The Kazinczy Street Synagogue of Miskolc is the only surviving synagogue in the city of Miskolc, Hungary, and the only still functioning synagogue of Borsod-Abaúj-Zemplén county.

The synagogue was designed by Ludwig Förster and built between 1856 and 1862 in neo-Romanesque style. Its Kazinczy Street facade has a rose window and narrow Gothic windows. The synagogue has three aisles. The women's balcony is supported by slim iron pillars decorated with Gothic Revival and Neo-Byzantine elements. The painting of the walls feature ornamental Eastern design.

When designing the synagogue, Förster made some innovations: he had an organ built and the Torah reader's platform was put before the Ark, not in the centre of the synagogue. These innovations were rejected by the Orthodox majority of the city's Jews, and in the year following the opening of the synagogue a rabbinical assembly in Sátoraljaújhely excommunicated the rabbi of Miskolc. The Jewish citizens of Miskolc decided to remove the organ from the synagogue and put the platform in the centre, in accord with  tradition.

This event led to a split in the Jewish community, and the local Hasidim ("Sefardim") separated from the rest, building a small place of worship in Kölcsey street, which no longer survives.

Another synagogue built in 1817, in Pálóczy Street, was demolished in 1963.

According to the 1920 census, Miskolc had about 10,000 Jewish residents (16.5% of the total population) but the majority of them fell victim to The Holocaust. At the Déryné Street entrance to the synagogue are marble tablets commemorating that tragic event. Another commemorative plaque can be seen in János Arany Street, where the ghetto once was.

As of 2001, the city has about 500 Jewish residents.

External links
 Picture of the Kazinczy street synagogue
 Some information and a picture of the synagogue of Pálóczy street
 A picture of the inside of the Kazinczy street synagogue (with a short Hungarian-language article)
 Great Synagogue in Miskolc, Hungary in the Bezalel Narkiss Index of Jewish Art, Center for Jewish Art, Hebrew University of Jerusalem.

Miskolc, Synagogue of
Buildings and structures in Miskolc
Miskolc, Synagogue of
Synagogues completed in 1862
1862 establishments in the Austrian Empire
Religious organizations established in 1862